Smith's Block, or Smith Block, is an historic building in Portland, Oregon's Old Town Chinatown, in the United States. The 24,000 square-foot structure was completed in 1872 for $50,000. Designed by W.W. Piper, the building exhibits Italianate architecture and has been designated a Portland Historic Landmark. It houses the restaurant Lechon.

References

External links

 
 Smith Block at Bremik Construction
 Smith's Block at Emporis
 Smith's Block at United Fund Advisors

1872 establishments in Oregon
Buildings and structures completed in 1872
Italianate architecture in Oregon
Old Town Chinatown